Ryan Howe (born September 20, 1993) is an American soccer player

Career

College and Amateur
Howe spent his entire college career at Loyola University Chicago.  He made a total of 60 appearances for the Ramblers, and tallied 4 goals.

Howe also played in the Premier Development League for Ocean City Nor'easters in 2016.

Professional
Howe signed with United Soccer League side Saint Louis FC on March 5, 2017. He made his professional debut for the club on March 25, 2017, in a 0–0 draw with Louisville City FC.

References

External links
Ramblers bio

1993 births
Living people
American soccer players
Loyola Ramblers men's soccer players
Ocean City Nor'easters players
Saint Louis FC players
Association football defenders
Soccer players from Illinois
USL League Two players
USL Championship players
Sportspeople from Rockford, Illinois